Qatrani-ye Olya Yek (also Romanized as Qaţrānī-ye ‘Olyā Yek; also known as Girāni and Qaţrānī) is a village in Buzi Rural District, in the Central District of Shadegan County, Khuzestan Province, Iran. At the 2006 census, its population was 44, in 6 families.

References 

Populated places in Shadegan County